Tashrique Moegamat Goldman (born 21 May 1987 in Port Elizabeth) is a South African Association football goalkeeper who plays for National First Division club Milano United.

Previous clubs: Chippa United, University of Pretoria, Maritzburg United, FC Cape Town, Hanover Park, Mitchells Plain United, UPE-FCK School of Excellence,

References

1983 births
Living people
Sportspeople from Port Elizabeth
Maritzburg United F.C. players
South African soccer players
Association football goalkeepers
F.C. Cape Town players
University of Pretoria F.C. players
Chippa United F.C. players
Soccer players from the Eastern Cape